Vladislav Yamukov (Bulgarian Cyrillic: Владислав Ямуков) (born 22 Мarch 1980) is a Bulgarian football defender, who currently plays for Zagorets Nova Zagora.

References

Bulgarian footballers
1980 births
Living people
Association football defenders
First Professional Football League (Bulgaria) players
FC Haskovo players
OFC Sliven 2000 players
PFC Beroe Stara Zagora players